The Algerian Cup football competition has been played most years since 1962. , three clubs - USM Alger, MC Alger and ES Sétif - have each won the Cup eight times.

Finals

Key

Results

Performance by club

Titles by city

References

External links
 RSSSF cup history
 Algeria Coupe Nationale - Hailoosport.com (Arabic)
 Algeria Coupe Nationale - Hailoosport.com

Algerian Cup